El Dorado Township is a township in Butler County, Kansas, USA.  As of the 2000 census, its population was 1,700.

El Dorado Township was organized in 1867.

Geography
According to the USGS, it contains three cemeteries: Belle Vista, Sunset Lawns and Walnut Valley Memorial Park.

The streams of Constant Creek, Sutton Creek and West Branch Walnut River run through this township.

Transportation
El Dorado Township contains one airport or landing strip, El Dorado Municipal Airport.

Further reading

References

 USGS Geographic Names Information System (GNIS)

External links
 City-Data.com

Townships in Butler County, Kansas
Townships in Kansas